Martin Kafka (born 25 July 1978 in Říčany) is a former Czech rugby player and the current coach of the Czech Republic. His great-uncle was the famous writer Franz Kafka and his grandfather was a German international footballer.

Early years
Kafka started playing rugby at the age of seven at his hometown club. In 1997 he went to study at the Faculty of Physical Education and Sport at the Charles University in Prague, with the intention of becoming a Physical Education teacher.

Rugby career
He went to Spain in 1999, playing for Valencia, who were then in the Spanish Second Division (División de Honor B).

In 2001 he joined La Moraleja Alcobendas, which boasted international players such as the Souto brothers, Carlos and Sergio. His two seasons at the club was a particularly successful part of his career, with him leading the club to victory against Overmach Parma in the European Challenge Cup in 2002 and finishing up as top scorer in the Spanish First Division (División de Honor) in both 2002 and 2003. In 2003 he played for Castres in France, and Racing Métro the following year before rounding out his playing career at Japanese Top League side Sanix.

International
He won at least 37 caps for the Czech Republic from 2000 to 2006, scoring at least 136 points in the process before assuming the coach's mantle in 2007.

Honours
Czech Rugby Player of the Year:
2002

References

External links
Martin Kafka profile at scrum.com
Martin Kafka at ercrugby.com

1978 births
Living people
Czech rugby union players
Czech rugby union coaches
Rugby union fly-halves
Rugby union centres
Expatriate rugby union players in Spain
Expatriate rugby union players in France
Czech expatriate rugby union players
Czech expatriate sportspeople in Spain
Czech expatriate sportspeople in France
Expatriate rugby union players in Japan
Czech expatriate sportspeople in Japan
Alcobendas rugby players
RC Valencia players
RC Říčany players
People from Říčany
Sportspeople from the Central Bohemian Region
Charles University alumni